Tomás Asprea (born 28 February 1995) is an Argentine professional footballer who plays as a right midfielder for Ferro Carril Oeste, on loan from Comunicaciones.

Career
Asprea started his career with Arsenal de Sarandí. In 2016, Asprea signed for Primera B Metropolitana side Comunicaciones. He made his professional bow during a goalless draw with Talleres on 21 February, which was his sole start in the 2016 campaign - though he did make five further appearances off the bench. His first goal arrived on 15 April 2017 versus Villa San Carlos. Midway through 2017–18, in January 2018, Asprea joined Primera B Nacional's Ferro Carril Oeste on loan for twelve months. He scored one goal in twenty-seven during that spell, with his loan being extended by six months in December.

After thirty-one total games and one goal, versus Los Andes, for Ferro, Asprea returned to Comunicaciones on 30 June 2019. However, on 5 July, he returned to the Caballito outfit on fresh loan terms.

Career statistics
.

References

External links

1995 births
Living people
Sportspeople from Lanús
Argentine footballers
Association football midfielders
Primera B Metropolitana players
Primera Nacional players
Arsenal de Sarandí footballers
Club Comunicaciones footballers
Ferro Carril Oeste footballers